Romaplasm is the third studio album by American electronic musician Baths. It was released by Anticon on November 17, 2017.

Critical reception

At Metacritic, which assigns a weighted average score out of 100 to reviews from mainstream critics, the album received an average score of 73 based on 8 reviews, indicating "generally favorable reviews".

Christopher Laird of PopMatters gave the album 6 stars out of 10, calling it "[Baths'] most personal and reflective album to date." Sasha Geffen of Pitchfork gave the album a 7.9 out of 10, saying, "Without abandoning the conundrums that made Obsidian so emotionally indelible, he's embellished the worlds of his songs with color from the dreams in which he's immersed himself over the years."

Track listing

Personnel 
Credits adapted from AllMusic website.

Musicians
 Will Wiesesfield – performer, composer
 Emily Call – violin
 Alfred Dalrington – bass clarinet
 Madeline Falcone – violin
 Isaura String Quartet – strings
 Betsy Rettig – cello
 Melinda Rice – viola
 Derek Stein – cello
 John Wiesenfeld – guitar
 Adam Wolf – french horn

Technical personnel
 Daddy Kev – mastering
 Morgan Greenwood – additional production
 Mario Luna – engineering

Artwork
 Will Wiesesfield – cover photography
 Mario Luna – cover photography
 Cory Schmitz – design, layout, text

References 

2017 albums
Anticon albums
Baths (musician) albums